This was the first edition of the tournament.

Treat Huey and Nathaniel Lammons won the title after defeating André Göransson and Hunter Reese 6–4, 7–6(7–3) in the final.

Seeds

Draw

References

External links
 Main draw

Split Open - Doubles
Split Open